John William Muir (15 December 1879 – 11 January 1931) was the editor of The Worker, a newspaper of the Clyde Workers' Committee, who was prosecuted under the Defence of the Realm Act for an article criticising the war.

Born in Glasgow, by the early 1910s Muir was the editor of The Socialist, the newspaper of the Socialist Labour Party.  However, he resigned the post in 1914, as he was in favour of World War I.

He became involved in the Shop Stewards' Movement, and was a member of the Clyde Workers' Committee, an organisation that had been formed to campaign against the Munitions Act, which forbade engineers from leaving the works where they were employed.  For publishing an article in The Worker entitled "Should the workers arm?", Muir was jailed for twelve months, alongside Willie Gallacher.

In 1917, Muir joined the Independent Labour Party, and became close to John Wheatley.  In the 1918 election, he stood for the Labour Party in Glasgow Maryhill, but was unsuccessful.  He won the seat in the 1922 general election and retained the seat in 1923.  He lost his seat in the 1924 election, after which he ran the Workers Educational Association until 1930.

References

Oxford Dictionary of National Biography

1879 births
1931 deaths
British anti–World War I activists
Independent Labour Party MPs
Scottish Labour MPs
Members of the Parliament of the United Kingdom for Glasgow constituencies
Prisoners and detainees of the United Kingdom
Red Clydeside
Socialist Labour Party (UK, 1903) members
Scottish prisoners and detainees
Scottish socialists
UK MPs 1922–1923
UK MPs 1923–1924
Scottish trade unionists
Maryhill
Workers' Educational Association